This is a table containing the figures from the ECDC Influenza A Situation Updates issued in October 2009 roughly three times a week.  From 30 September, ECDC only published deaths totals, and so the world cases table has not been maintained. The table can be sorted by country, date of first confirmed case or date of first confirmed case by continent.

This presentation of the data in this and other tables may show the progression, peaks, and, eventually, decline of the epidemic in each country and continent.

Summary tables | Previous month | Next month

Deaths

References

October 2009